Veijo Kaakinen (10 December 1907 – 19 November 1976) was a Finnish sports shooter. He competed in the 50 m rifle event at the 1948 Summer Olympics.

References

1907 births
1976 deaths
Finnish male sport shooters
Olympic shooters of Finland
Shooters at the 1948 Summer Olympics
Sportspeople from Oulu